Carnage Euphoria is the seventh album by Swedish death metal band Vomitory. It was released on May 8, 2009, on Metal Blade.

Track listing 
 "The Carnage Rages On" – 4:30	
 "Serpents" – 3:24	
 "A Lesson in Virulence" – 4:46	
 "Ripe Cadavers" – 4:19	
 "Rage of Honour" – 2:35	
 "The Ravenous Dead" – 4:31	
 "Deadlock" – 3:10	
 "Rebirth of the Grotesque" – 4:04	
 "Possessed" – 2:14	
 "Great Deceiver" – 5:25

Personnel
 Erik Rundqvist – bass guitar, vocals
 Tobias Gustafsson – drums
 Peter Östlund – guitar
 Urban Gustafsson – guitar
Vomitory – production
Rikard Löfgren – production, engineering, mixing, mastering

Release
Carnage Euphoria was released in Germany, Austria and Switzerland on May 8, 2009; in Sweden and Finland on May 12, 2009; and in the rest of Europe on  May 11, 2009.

References 

2009 albums
Vomitory (band) albums
Metal Blade Records albums